The BG&CM Railroad or Bountiful Grain and Craig Mountain Railroad  is a Class III shortline railroad located in North Central Idaho.

Summary
The BG&CM operated a line between Spalding and Cottonwood, along the former Second Subdivision of the Camas Prairie Railroad. BGCM connects with Great Northwest Railroad at Spalding. BGCM also operates the portion of the former Camas Prairie Railroad which runs from Spalding to Orofino, then to Kooskia along the river grade of the Clearwater River.

In 2005, Watco, owner of the BGCM's Spalding connection Great Northwest Railroad (GRNW), leased to BGCM the entire  GRNW route east of Lewiston of mainline track, including the railroad from Orofino to Konkolville.

The BGCM route had been acquired from Camas Prairie RailNet (CSPR) in December 2002, a subsidiary of North American RailNet, which had acquired the entire Camas Prairie line in April 1998 from the line's previous (and original) co-owners, Union Pacific and BNSF. CSPR received permission from the Surface Transportation Board to abandon the Grangeville Branch in September 2000 and made its last run on that line in late November. Watco had acquired the remainder of the Camas Prairie RailNet in March 2004.

As of April, 2013, the second sub is used for storage of empty flatcars between Lapwai and Culdesac. The grade crossing of US 95 south of Craigmont has been removed and the crossings in that town are graveled over. Also, one of the wooden trestles—Bridge 21.3—near Winchester was lost in a forest fire on September 7, 2011. All that remains of the trestle is a single rail suspended precariously across the chasm, as well as ashes and bits of metal beneath. A fire also destroyed the original elevators at Craigmont, beginning on May 12, 2013. The fire smoldered for nearly three weeks.

History
The Camas Prairie Railroad was formed in 1909, and was jointly owned and operated by the former Northern Pacific Railway (later Burlington Northern Santa Fe), and the former Oregon-Washington Railroad and Navigation Company (later Union Pacific). The two railroads were competitors throughout the Pacific Northwest, battling to capture railroad traffic in timber, minerals, and agricultural products. Camas Prairie Railroad was sold by co-owners UP and BNSF to North American RailNet of Bedford, Texas in April 1998 and it became Camas Prairie RailNet, Inc. After six years it was sold to Watco and became Great Northwest Railroad in March 2004. The Orofino to Jaype segment was out of service.

BGCM is owned by Midwest Pacific Rail Net & Logistics of Kansas City.

MPRL also owns:
 Boot Hill and Western Railway (Out of Service)
 Dakota Southern Railway
 Fremont Northern Railway
 Iowa River Railroad
 Nevada Northern Railway
 McCloud River Railroad (Out of Service)
 Ozark Valley Railroad
 St. Maries River Railroad
 Washington and Idaho Railway

In 2009, BGCM's owner attempted to purchase a portion of the Arizona and California Railroad, running  between Rice, California and Ripley, California through Blythe, California from RailAmerica then-recently granted for abandonment, but failed to succeed an offer of financial assistance process.

Connection
Great Northwest Railroad (GRNW) at Spalding, Idaho. GRNW is a WATCO company, which owns 35 shortline railroads nationwide.

Motive Power

BGCM operates an ex-ATSF GP30, numbered as BGCM 2404 (EMD 27191, 7622-5, April 1962; ex-BNSF 2404; ex-ATSF 2704:2; ex-ATSF 3204; née-ATSF 1204), as well as an EMD GP9u, numbered as BGCM 1639.

References

External links

 TrainWeb.org Rosters
 North Central Idaho News, February 2006
 Railnet sale to Watco

Idaho railroads
Switching and terminal railroads